Ihor Kosenko (born 3 November 1977) is a Ukrainian Paralympic footballer who won a gold medal at the 2008 Summer Paralympics in China.

Awards
Ihor Kosenko is a recipient of various Order of Merit awards, including:
Order of Merit, 1st class (2008)
Order of Merit, 2nd class (2004)
Order of Merit, 3rd class (2003) 
Order For Courage, 3rd class (2012)

References

External links
 Ihor Kosenko
 

1977 births
Living people
Paralympic 7-a-side football players of Ukraine
Paralympic gold medalists for Ukraine
Paralympic silver medalists for Ukraine
Paralympic medalists in football 7-a-side
7-a-side footballers at the 2004 Summer Paralympics
7-a-side footballers at the 2008 Summer Paralympics
7-a-side footballers at the 2012 Summer Paralympics
Medalists at the 2004 Summer Paralympics
Medalists at the 2008 Summer Paralympics
Medalists at the 2012 Summer Paralympics
Recipients of the Order of Merit (Ukraine), 1st class
Recipients of the Order of Merit (Ukraine), 2nd class
Recipients of the Order of Merit (Ukraine), 3rd class
Recipients of the Order For Courage, 3rd class